Busthead, a tiny community in the western end of Baptist Valley, near Cedar Bluff, is an unincorporated community located in Tazewell County, Virginia.

References

Unincorporated communities in Tazewell County, Virginia
Unincorporated communities in Virginia